Froukje de Both (born 20 April 1972) is a Dutch actress and radio and television presenter. She is known for playing the role of Mariët Zoomers in Goudkust from 1996 till 2000 and for the role of Agnetha in Costa! from 2001 till 2004. She is also known for presenting many television shows.

Career 

In 2011, she appeared in the television game show De Jongens tegen de Meisjes. She also appeared on several occasions in the television game show Ik hou van Holland.

In 2015, she was one of the presenters of Wie doet de afwas?, together with Angela Groothuizen and Nance Coolen. The show served as replacement for Goede tijden, slechte tijden during its annual break in the summer months. This was also the case for the television show Ik kom bij je eten which she presented from 2009 till 2012.

, she presents Eigen Huis & Tuin: Lekker leven, a version of Eigen Huis & Tuin with a focus on lifestyle, cooking and living.

She appeared in the 23rd season of the television show Wie is de Mol?. She was eliminated in the second episode.

Filmography

As actress 

 Goudkust (1996 – 2000)
 Costa! (2001 – 2004)
 Missie Warmoesstraat (2004)

As presenter 

 Ik kom bij je eten (2009 – 2012)
 Wie doet de afwas? (2015)
 De grote improvisatieshow (2014, 2015)

As contestant 

 Ik hou van Holland (2009, 2011, 2012, 2014)
 De Jongens tegen de Meisjes (2011, 2014)
 Weet Ik Veel (2013)
 Wie ben ik? (2014)
 Wie is de Mol? (2023)

References

External links 

 

1972 births
Living people
Dutch television actresses
Dutch television presenters
Dutch women television presenters
Dutch soap opera actresses
21st-century Dutch women
21st-century Dutch actresses